Longchaeus inopinatus is a species of sea snail, a marine gastropod mollusk in the family Pyramidellidae, the pyrams and their allies.

Description
The shell grows to a length of between 6 mm and 12 mm.

Distribution
This marine species occurs in the following locations:
 Cape Verde
 Atlantic Ocean off Guinea, Senegal and Angola.

References

External links
 To Encyclopedia of Life

Pyramidellidae
Gastropods described in 1994
Molluscs of the Atlantic Ocean
Gastropods of Cape Verde
Molluscs of Angola
Invertebrates of Guinea
Invertebrates of West Africa